Pingfang District is one of nine districts of the prefecture-level city of Harbin, the capital of Heilongjiang Province, Northeast China, forming part of the city's urban core. The least spacious of Harbin's county-level divisions, it borders the districts of Xiangfang to the north, Acheng to the east, Shuangcheng to the southwest, and Nangang to the west.

History 
Pingfang was the headquarters of the Japanese Biological Warfare Unit 731 during the Japanese invasion of China and World War II. It had an airport, railway and dungeons. Most of Pingfang was burnt by Japanese officials to destroy evidence but the incinerator where the remains of victims were burnt remains and is still in use as part of a factory.

Administrative divisions 
Pingfang District is divided into 9 subdistricts and 1 town. 
9 subdistricts
 Xingjian, Baoguo, Lianmeng, Youxie, Xinjiang, Xinwei, Pingxin, Jian'an, Pingsheng
1 town
 Pingfang

Economy 
Pingfang is an industrial center of Harbin nowadays. Hafei (a factory producing helicopters, small airplanes, minivans, and cars), Dongan (a factory producing aircraft and automobile engines), and Northeast Light Alloy Processing Plant are the three major manufacturers there.

Harbin Aircraft Industry Group (Hafei) has its headquarters in the district.

References

External links
 Unit 731, a half century of denial

Military history of Japan during World War II
Districts of Harbin